The 1st Daily Express Spring Cup was a non-Championship motor race, run to Formula One rules, held on 15 April 1967 at Oulton Park circuit in Cheshire, UK. The race was run over two heats of 10 laps of the circuit, then a final of 30 laps, and was won overall by Jack Brabham in a Brabham-Repco BT20.

The race was organised by the Mid-Cheshire Motor Racing Club in order to raise funds for the Grand Prix Medical Unit, inaugurated by BRM chairman Louis Stanley as an indirect result of Jackie Stewart's accident at the 1966 Belgian Grand Prix. All prize money, start money and gate money were donated to the fund.

The grid positions for the first heat were decided by a qualifying session, and the grid for the second heat was determined by the finishing order of the first heat. Similarly, the finishing order for the second heat decided the grid order for the final.

Jackie Stewart qualified his BRM in pole position for the first heat. Brabham driver Denny Hulme won both heats and Jack Brabham won the final, with Brabham and Hulme sharing fastest lap in the final. Brabham took fastest lap in the first heat, and Hulme shared fastest lap with BRM's Mike Spence in the second heat.

Results

Heat 1

Heat 2

Final

References 
 Results at Silhouet.com 
 Results at Motor Sport Magazine 

Spring Cup
April 1967 sports events in the United Kingdom
1967 in English sport
1967 in British motorsport